Elections to Midlothian Council were held on 6 April 1995, the same day as the other Scottish local government elections. Midlothian had been created as a unitary authority under the Local Government etc. (Scotland) Act 1994.

Labour won every seat on the council, bar two, which were won by the SNP.

Election results

Ward results

References

1995 Scottish local elections
1995